= Mugaliya Hat =

- village
- Location within Madhya Pradesh Location within India
- Coordinates: 23.3519473°N 77.2577571°E
- Country: India
- State: Madhya Pradesh
- District: Bhopal
- Tehsil: Huzur
- Elevation: 521 m (1,709 ft)

Population (2011)
  - Total: 2,162
- Time zone: UTC+5:30 (IST)
- ISO 3166 code: MP-IN
- 2011 census code: 482348

Mugaliya Hat is a village in the Bhopal district of Madhya Pradesh, India. It is located in the Huzur tehsil and the Phanda block.

== Demographics ==
According to the 2011 census of India, Mugaliya Hat has 423 households. The effective literacy rate (i.e. the literacy rate of population excluding children aged 6 and below) is 68.51%.

Demographics (2011 Census)
	Total	Male	Female
Population	2162	1088	1074
Children aged below 6 years	285	138	147
Scheduled caste	500	240	260
Scheduled tribe	0	0	0
Literates	1286	766	520
Workers (all)	1018	611	407
Main workers (total)	464	420	44
Main workers: Cultivators	207	195	12
Main workers: Agricultural labourers	142	128	14
Main workers: Household industry workers	15	14	1
Main workers: Other	100	83	17
Marginal workers (total)	554	191	363
Marginal workers: Cultivators	161	35	126
Marginal workers: Agricultural labourers	357	138	219
Marginal workers: Household industry workers	13	5	8
Marginal workers: Others	23	13	10
Non-workers	1144	477	667
